Romblonella is a genus of myrmicine ants.

Systematics
Romblonella is probably the sister taxon to Stereomyrmex. Closely related genera are Leptothorax and Cardiocondyla.

Biology
Very little is known about these uncommon ants. Most species were found to nest in twigs on trees and to forage on low vegetation.

Description

Workers of R. opaca are about 4 mm long. They have a small sting. R. opaca was described from four specimens found on Romblon Island, Philippines, by Wheeler (1935). However, the species had already been described by F. Smith in 1861 as Myrmica opaca, which had been collected at Tondano, Sulawesi by Alfred Russel Wallace.

R. elysii workers are 2 mm long. They were originally described as Crematogaster from a few workers from the Solomon Islands. R. heatwolei workers are almost 4 mm long.

Only for R. palauensis and R. heatwolei have males been described.

Distribution
Romblonella is found from the Philippines south through New Guinea, with one species known from Australia. The distribution stretches to the islands of the western South Pacific.

Name
The genus is named after the locality where the type species was found.

Species
 Romblonella elysii (Mann, 1919) — Malapina, Big Nggela: Solomon Islands
 Romblonella heatwolei Taylor, 1991 — Wyer Island: Torres Strait: Queensland: Australia
 Romblonella opaca (F. Smith, 1861) — Philippines, Indonesia
 Romblonella palauensis M. R. Smith, 1953 — Auluptagel, Urukthapal, Babelthaub: Palau: Caroline Islands
 Romblonella scrobifera (Emery, 1897) — Aitape, Manus Province, East Sepik Province, Morobe Province, East New Britain Province: New Guinea
 Romblonella townesi M. R. Smith, 1953 — Mount Lasso: Tinian Island: Northern Mariana Islands
 Romblonella vitiensis M. R. Smith, 1953 — Wakaya Island: Fiji Islands
 Romblonella yapensis M. R. Smith, 1953 — Yap Island: Caroline Islands

Images

Footnotes

References
 Emery, Carlo (1897): Formicidarum species novae vel minus cognitae in collectione Musaei Nationalis Hungarici, quas in Nova Guinea, colonia germanica, collegit L. Biro. Termeszetrajzi Fuzetek 20: 571-599. PDF
 Mann, William M. (1919): The ants of the British Solomon Islands. Bulletin of the Museum of Comparative Zoology of Harvard College 63: 273-391. PDF
 Smith, Frederick (1861): Catalogue of hymenopterous insects collected by Mr. A. R. Wallace in the Islands of Ceram, Celebes, Ternate, and Gilolo. Journal of the Proceedings of the Linnean Society of London, Zoology 6: 36-48. PDF
 ITIS: Genus Romblonella

Further reading
 Smith, Marion R. (1953): A revision of the genus Romblonella W. M. Wheeler (Hymenoptera: Formicidae). Proceedings of the Hawaiian Entomological Society 15: 75-80. PDF

External links

Myrmicinae
Ant genera
Hymenoptera of Asia
Hymenoptera of Australia